January 24 - Eastern Orthodox liturgical calendar - January 26

All fixed commemorations below are observed on February 7 by Orthodox Churches on the Old Calendar.

For January 25th, Orthodox Churches on the Old Calendar commemorate the Saints listed on January 12.

Saints
 Venerable Castinus of Byzantium, Bishop of Byzantium (240)
 Martyr Medula and her entourage. 
 Venerable Apollo of the Thebaid, ascetic and wonderworker, reposed in peace (ca. 361-363)
 Saint Bretanion (Vetranion), Bishop of Tomis in Moesia, Confessor (ca. 380)
 Venerable Publius of Syria, ascetic of Euphratensis in Syria (380)
 Venerable Theodotos, Igumen of the "Monastery of St. Publius".
 Saint Gregory the Theologian, Archbishop of Constantinople (390)
 Venerable Mares the Singer, of Omeros near Cyrrhus (430)
 Venerable Demetrius the Skevophylax ("Keeper of the Sacred Vessels") of Constantinople (8th century)

Pre-Schism Western saints
 Martyrs Felicitas of Rome and seven sons (ca. 164):  (see also: November 23 in the West)
 Januarius, Felix, Philip, Silvanus, Alexander, Vitalis, and Martial.
 Saint Artemas, a child martyr in Pozzuoli (Puteoli) in Italy. 
 Saint Dwynwen of Llanddwyn Island, Patroness of Love and Marriage (c. 460)
 Saint Eochod of Galloway, Apostle of the Picts of Galloway (597)
 Saint Maurus (584) and Saint Placidus (6th century), early disciples of St Benedict. 
 Saint Sigeberht of East Anglia (Sigebert), the first Christian King of East Anglia in England (634)
 Saint Racho of Autun (Ragnobert), Bishop of Autun in France (ca. 660)
 Hieromartyr Praejectus (Priest, Prest, Preils, Prix), Bishop of Clermont (676)
 Saint Amarinus, Abbot of a monastery in the Vosges in France, and companion in martyrdom of St Praejectus (St Priest) (676)
 Saint Thorgyth (Tortgith), nun at the convent of Barking in England with St Ethelburgh (ca. 700)
 Saint Poppo of Stavelot, Abbot of Stavelot-Malmédy in Belgium, renowned for miracles (1048)

Post-Schism Orthodox saints
 Saint Moses of Novgorod, Archbishop of Novgorod (1362) (see also: April 19 - Translation)
 Saint Gregory of Golutvin (15th century)
 Saint Basian, Archbishop of Rostov (1516)  (see also: March 23)
 New Martyr Auxentius of Constantinople (1720)
 Saint Anatole I (Zertsalov) of Optina Monastery, Elder of Optina (1894)
 Saint Gabriel, Bishop of Imereti (Georgia) (1896)

New martyrs and confessors
 New Hieromartyr Vladimir (Bogoyavlensky), Metropolitan of Kiev, Protomartyr of the Communist yoke in Russia (1918)
 Venerable New Martyr St. Elizabeth Romanova (Princess Elisabeth of Hesse and by Rhine (1864–1918)) (1918)
 Venerable New Martyr Abbess Margaret (Gunaronulo) of Menzelino (1918)
 New Hieromartyr Peter (Zverev), Archbishop of Voronezh (1929)
 New Hieromartyr Basil (Zelentsov), Bishop of Priluki (1930)
 New Martyr Athanasia (Lepeshkin), Abbess of the Smolensk Hodigitria Convent, near Moscow (1931)
 New Hieromartyr Stephen Grachev, Priest (1938)
 New Martyr Boris Zavarin (1938)

Other commemorations
 Icon of the Most Holy Theotokos "Assuage My Sorrow" (1640)
 Icons of the Most Holy Theotokos "Unexpected Joy."
 Repose of Archpriest Sergius Orlov of Akulovo (1975)
 Holy New Martyrs and Confessors of Russia (1992, 2013)  ( celebrated on the Sunday nearest to January 25 )

Icon gallery

Notes

References

Sources
 January 25 / February 7. Orthodox Calendar (PRAVOSLAVIE.RU).
 February 7 / January 25. HOLY TRINITY RUSSIAN ORTHODOX CHURCH (A parish of the Patriarchate of Moscow).
 January 25. OCA - The Lives of the Saints.
 The Autonomous Orthodox Metropolia of Western Europe and the Americas (ROCOR). St. Hilarion Calendar of Saints for the year of our Lord 2004. St. Hilarion Press (Austin, TX). p. 10.
 January 25. Latin Saints of the Orthodox Patriarchate of Rome.
 The Roman Martyrology. Transl. by the Archbishop of Baltimore. Last Edition, According to the Copy Printed at Rome in 1914. Revised Edition, with the Imprimatur of His Eminence Cardinal Gibbons. Baltimore: John Murphy Company, 1916. pp. 25–26.
 Rev. Richard Stanton. A Menology of England and Wales, or, Brief Memorials of the Ancient British and English Saints Arranged According to the Calendar, Together with the Martyrs of the 16th and 17th Centuries. London: Burns & Oates, 1892. pp. 35–36.
Greek Sources
 Great Synaxaristes:  25 ΙΑΝΟΥΑΡΙΟΥ. ΜΕΓΑΣ ΣΥΝΑΞΑΡΙΣΤΗΣ.
  Συναξαριστής. 25 Ιανουαρίου. ECCLESIA.GR. (H ΕΚΚΛΗΣΙΑ ΤΗΣ ΕΛΛΑΔΟΣ). 
Russian Sources
  7 февраля (25 января). Православная Энциклопедия под редакцией Патриарха Московского и всея Руси Кирилла (электронная версия). (Orthodox Encyclopedia - Pravenc.ru).
  25 января (ст.ст.) 7 февраля 2013 (нов. ст.). Русская Православная Церковь Отдел внешних церковных связей. (DECR).

January in the Eastern Orthodox calendar